The 166th Airlift Wing (166th AW) of the Delaware Air National Guard (DANG) is stationed at New Castle Air National Guard Base, Delaware. If activated to federal service, the Wing is gained by the United States Air Force Air Mobility Command.

Overview
The 166th Airlift Wing is based at the New Castle County Airport just outside Wilmington, Delaware. Operating eight permanently assigned, Lockheed C-130H2 Hercules transport aircraft, the wing provides the U.S. Air Force with tactical airlift, airdrop capability of paratroops and cargo, and aeromedical evacuation of patients anywhere in the world. Additionally, the wing has a civil engineer function and a network warfare unit (the 166th Network Warfare Squadron).

Under command of the Governor of Delaware, the wing is prepared to support the State of Delaware with trained personnel and equipment for various humanitarian missions to protect life and property and to preserve peace, order and public safety. The wing's gaining command is the Air Mobility Command, U.S. Air Force.

Units
The 166th Airlift Wing consists of the following units:
 166th Operations Group
 142d Airlift Squadron
 142d Aeromedical Evacuation Squadron
 166th Operations Support Squadron
 166th Cyberspace Operations Squadron
 166th Maintenance Group
 166th Aircraft Maintenance Squadron
 166th Maintenance Squadron
 166th Maintenance Operations Flight
 166th Mission Support Group
 166th Civil Engineer Squadron
 166th Communications Flight
 166th Force Support Squadron
 166th Logistics Readiness Squadron
 166th Security Forces Squadron 
 166th Medical Group

History
On 7 April 1962 the Delaware Air National Guard, with the 142nd Tactical Fighter Squadron, enlarged to "group status" as the 166th Air Transport Group and then was reassigned from the Tactical Air Command to the Military Air Transport Service. The Delaware Air National Guard gave up its F-86 Sabrejets for the four engine C-97 Stratocruiser cargo planes.

Dr. Harold Brown, Secretary of the Air Force, announced that effective 1 January 1966, the Military Air Transport Service would be redesignated as the Military Airlift Command. In addition to the name change certain Air National Guard units were also redesignated, including Delaware's. The unit was named the 166th Military Airlift Group.

During the period from 1969 to 1971 the Delaware Air National Guard flew missions to Vietnam.

On 9 April 1968, the Delaware Air National Guard was called to state duty to quell civil disturbance and violence in the city of Wilmington, Delaware. The unit was released from state duty after several weeks. However, many individuals remained on state duty through 20 January 1969.

On 12 May 1971 the Delaware ANG changed its name from the 166th Military Airlift Group to the 166th Tactical Airlift Group and replaced its C-97s with C-130A Hercules turboprop cargo plane, and began transition from the Military Airlift Command to the Tactical Air Command.

On 16 October 1985, the Delaware Air National Guard began replacing its aging, antiquated C-130A's with the delivery of a brand new factory fresh C-130H.  The last new C-130H aircraft arrived in January 1986.

On 25 January 1991 selected units of the Delaware Air National Guard were activated for the Persian Gulf War known as Operation Desert Storm. A majority of the unit was stationed at Al Kharj Air Base, Saudi Arabia. Over 150 personnel deployed to six other locations in Europe and two stateside bases. The 166th Civil Engineer Squadron voluntarily deployed to Dover Air Force Base, Delaware and performed the monumental accomplishment of enlarging Dover's Mortuary capacity - the assignment was completed in a record 23 days. On 30 June 1991 the units/personnel were released from active duty performed in support of the Persian Gulf War.

Another name change occurred on 16 March 1992, with the 166th Tactical Airlift Group being redesignated the 166th Airlift Group. In 1993 an Air Force reorganization placed the 166th under Air Combat Command.

On 1 October 1995, the 166th Airlift Group was renamed the 166th Airlift Wing and was gained by the Air Mobility Command.

In 2021, the unit's 1984 C-130H2 aircraft departed and the wing received newer 1991 C-130H2.5 aircraft.

Lineage
 Established as 166th Air Transport Group, and activated, 7 April 1962
 Re-designated: 166th Military Airlift Group, 8 January 1966
 Re-designated: 166th Tactical Airlift Group, 12 May 1971
 Re-designated: 166th Airlift Group, 1 June 1992
 Status changed from Group to Wing, 10 January 1995
 Re-designated: 166th Airlift Wing, 10 January 1995

Assignments
 Delaware Air National Guard, 7 April 1962
 Gained by: Military Air Transport Service
 Gained by: Military Airlift Command, 8 January 1966
 118th Tactical Airlift Wing, 12 May 1971 – 10 January 1995
 Delaware Air National Guard, 10 January 1995
 Gained by: Air Mobility Command

Stations
 New Castle County Airport, Delaware, 7 April 1962

Aircraft
 C-97 Stratocruiser, 1962-1971
 C-130 Hercules, 1971–Present

See also
 Delaware Air National Guard
 Hugh T. Broomall
 Francis D. Vavala

References

External links

Wings of the United States Air National Guard
0166
Military units and formations in Delaware